The 2022 Oklahoma Attorney General election took place on November 8, 2022, to elect the next attorney general of Oklahoma. The primary election was scheduled for Tuesday, June 28, 2022. The candidate filing deadline was April 15, 2022.

Appointed incumbent Republican Attorney General John O'Connor sought election to a full term, but lost his  party's nomination to Gentner Drummond. No Democratic candidates filed to run for the position. Lynda Steele was the Libertarian nominee. Drummond won the November general election.

Republican primary 
John M. O'Connor was the incumbent attorney general after being appointed by Governor Kevin Stitt. The seat had been vacated after Michael J. Hunter resigned due to an infidelity scandal. Gentner Drummond, who had narrowly lost to Hunter in 2018, challenged O'Connor in the Republican primary. Drummond campaigned as being independent of Governor Stitt.
The aftermath of McGirt v. Oklahoma was a dominant issue in the campaign. 
O'Connor argued that litigation to overturn or winnow the ruling in McGirt was warranted, whereas Drummond advocated compacting and negotiating with tribal nations. The candidates also differed in their opinions on  whether Congress should disestablish certain reservations at issue, with Drummond opposing such action). During the June 16 Republican primary debate, O'Connor called Drummond a "Democrat in Republican clothing." 
O'Connor ran ads attacking Drummond for a donation of $1,000 by Drummond to the Joe Biden Presidential campaign in 2020 as well as Drummond's history of giving to Democratic candidates. Drummond claimed that the donation to Biden's campaign was made by his wife and provided receipts showing the donation was later refunded. The Tulsa World reported that Drummond's last donation to a non-Republican candidate for federal office was to Matt Silverstein's 2014 United States Senate campaign. 
In the final month of the primary, over $1 million in dark money was spent on ads opposing O'Connor's candidacy. Drummond defeated O'Connor in the primary with 50.9% of the vote.

Candidates

Nominee
 Gentner Drummond, attorney, former staffer for U.S. Senator David Boren, and candidate for attorney general in 2018

Eliminated in primary
 John O'Connor, appointed incumbent Attorney General of Oklahoma (2021–present)

Endorsements

Polling

Debate

Results

General election

Candidates
Gentner Drummond (Republican)
Lynda Steele (Libertarian)

Predictions

Endorsements

Polling

Results

See also 
 Oklahoma Attorney General

Notes 

Partisan clients

References

External links 
 Official campaign websites
 Gentner Drummond (R) for Attorney General
 Lynda Steele (L) for Attorney General

2022 Oklahoma elections
Oklahoma
Oklahoma Attorney General elections